Lissopsius is a genus of braconid wasps in the family Braconidae. There are at least three described species in Lissopsius, found in Mexico and Central America.

Species
These three species belong to the genus Lissopsius:
 Lissopsius flavus Marsh, 2002
 Lissopsius jaliscoensis Zaldívar-Riverón, Martinez, Ceccarelli & Shaw, 2012
 Lissopsius pacificus Zaldívar-Riverón, Martinez, Ceccarelli & Shaw, 2012

References

Further reading

 

Parasitic wasps